Serraino is an Italian surname. Notable people with the surname include:

 Paolo Serraino (born 1942), Italian gangster of the Serraino 'ndrina
 Maria Serraino (1931–2017), Italian gangster of the Serraino 'ndrina

See also
Serrano (surname)

Italian-language surnames